Sphenocephalus (from  , 'wedge' and   'head') is an extinct genus of ray-finned fish that lived during the Cretaceous period. Fossils have been found in England and Italy.

It was one of the earliest fish to have the pelvic fins placed beneath th pectoral fins, a common feature in modern fish that improves swimming manoeuvrability. Like the modern trout-perches, it possessed a mixture of modern and primitive features, and it was probably one of the earliest perciform fish.

References

Prehistoric perciform genera
Cretaceous fish of Europe
Taxa named by Louis Agassiz